El Potrero River (Rio El Potrero) is a medium streams in El Salvador.

References

Rivers of El Salvador